Pedimental sculptures are sculptures within the frame of a pediment on the exterior of a building, some examples of which can be found in the United States. Pedimental sculpture pose special challenges to sculptors: the triangular composition limits the choices for figures or ornament at the ends, and the sculpture must be designed to be viewed both from below and from a distance.

History

Classical tradition 

Historian Walter Copland Perry wrote that it was proof of the power of Greek art that the classical sculptors not only overcame the rigid restrictions of the pediment's shape, but turned them to their advantage.  Compositionally, the restrictions imposed by both the physical triangular shape of a pediment, and the traditional themes that are usually employed for the subject matter, are, according to Professor Gardner of Oxford University, “as exactly regulated as that of a sonnet or a Spenserian stanza:  the artist has liberty only in certain directions and must not violate the laws of rhythm.”

In all examples, classical and modern, the central area below the apex is inevitably the tallest, most spacious, the natural focus, and will contain the main figures and the focus of action.  Secondary figures decrease in size and importance on both sides, as they approach the far angles at the base.  The well-known classical examples all observe "unity of action", although the Greek historian Pausanias describes a sculpture by Praxiteles in which Hercules appears several times in different sizes.

As with the ancient Greeks, and the Roman architects and sculptors who followed them, American artists had two different structural approaches creating pedimental sculpture. They are either freestanding statues that stand on the bed (the ledge or cornice that creates the bottom of the pediment), or they can be relief sculpture, attached to the back wall of the pediment.  As an additional physical restriction in the pediment format, a deeper recess will throw the triangular field into deeper shadow, which means the figures should be executed in deeper relief or fully in the round.

United States 

Pedimental sculptures in the United States were rare prior to the 1880s, most surviving examples in cities along the east coast. The earliest seems to be Whitehall (1765), outside Annapolis, Maryland, attributed to English architect Joseph Horatio Anderson and English-born carver William Buckland, typical of early dependence on European talent.

Greek Revival architecture became dominant throughout the first half of the 19th century, but almost always with chaste, blank pediments. It was only post-Civil War, with the advent of the American Renaissance and the City Beautiful movement – especially the architectural vision of "The White City" presented at Chicago's World's Columbian Exposition of 1893 – that the use of sculpture in pediments increased dramatically.

The advent of the Great Depression largely brought the use of pediment sculpture to a halt, with the major exception of government buildings of the Federal Triangle in Washington, D.C. completed in the mid-1930s.  One 21st-century example is the Schermerhorn Symphony Center in Nashville, Tennessee, with a pedimental sculpture Orpheus and Eurydice by sculptor Raymond Kaskey completed in 2006.

Pedimental sculptures in Washington, D.C. (by building)

Pedimental sculptures (by state, city, and building)

Alabama

Arizona

California

Colorado

Connecticut

Georgia

Idaho

Illinois

Indiana

Iowa

Kentucky

Louisiana

Maryland

Massachusetts

Michigan

Minnesota

Mississippi

Missouri

Nebraska

New Hampshire

New Jersey

New York

Ohio

Oklahoma

Oregon

Pennsylvania

South Carolina

Tennessee

Utah

Virginia

West Virginia

Wisconsin

See also
 Pedimental sculptures in Canada
 Architectural sculpture

References

Pedimental sculpture
Sculptures in the United States